The 2006 Ginetta Junior Championship season was the second season of the Ginetta Junior Championship. The season began at Snetterton on 1 April 2006 and concluded after 14 races over 7 events at Thruxton on 1 October 2006.

Teams and drivers
 All drivers raced in Ginetta G20 GT4 Coupés.
 All drivers entered as privateers.
 All teams and drivers were British-registered.

Race calendar and results

† Non championship round

Drivers' Championship

 – Dominic Pettit was not classified for not running at the red flag.
† Non championship round

References

External links
 Official website
 tsl-timing

Ginetta Junior Championship
Ginetta Junior Championship seasons